snoR9 is a non-coding RNA (ncRNA) which functions in the biogenesis (modification) of other small nuclear RNAs (snRNAs).  It is known as a small nucleolar RNA (snoRNA) and also often referred to as a 'guide RNA'.

R9 is a member of the C/D box class of snoRNAs which contain the conserved sequence motifs known as the C box (UGAUGA) and the D box (CUGA). Most of the members of the box C/D family function in directing site-specific 2'-O-methylation of substrate RNAs.

This snoRNA was identified in a computational search for GC-rich regions in the AT-rich genomes of hyperthermophiles. This snoRNA is not related to the plant snoRNA snoR9.

References

External links
 

Small nuclear RNA